Selas is a municipality located in the province of Guadalajara, Castile-La Mancha, Spain. According to the 2004 census (INE), the municipality has a population of 63 inhabitants.

The Mesa River rises in the Sierra de Solorio range area near Selas.

See also
List of municipalities in Guadalajara

References

External links
Selas y Turmiel, Guadalajara

Municipalities in the Province of Guadalajara